Koloeim (also Romanized as Koloe’īm and Kolū’īm; also known as Keleim) is a village in Chavarzaq Rural District, Chavarzaq District, Tarom County, Zanjan Province, Iran. At the 2006 census, its population was 473, in 103 families.

References 

Populated places in Tarom County